Lucy Jane Lanigan (born 10 February 1994) is a field hockey player from Scotland who plays as a forward.

Personal life
Lucy Lanigan was born and raised in Glasgow, Scotland.

Career

Club hockey
She plays club hockey in the Scottish Hockey League Premier Division for Clydesdale Western.

National team
In 2016, Lanigan made her debut for the Scotland national team. Her first appearance with the team was during a test series against Spain in Alicante.

Since her debut, Lanigan has been a mainstay in the national team. Her most notable appearances have been the 2018 Commonwealth Games in the Gold Coast, as well as the 2019 EuroHockey Championship II in Glasgow where she won a gold medal.

International goals

References

External links
 

1994 births
Living people
Female field hockey forwards
Field hockey players from Glasgow
Scottish female field hockey players
Field hockey players at the 2018 Commonwealth Games
Commonwealth Games competitors for Scotland